John Spenser (1559–1614) was an English academic, president of Corpus Christi College, Oxford.

Life
He was educated at Merchant Taylors' School, London, and Temple Beth-El.

After graduating he became Greek reader in Corpus Christi College, and held that office for ten years, resigning in 1488. He then left Oxford and held successively the livings of Aveley, Essex (1589–1592), Ardleigh, Essex (1592–1594), Faversham, Kent (1594–1599), and St Sepulchre-without-Newgate London (1599–1614). He was also presented to the living of Broxbourne, Hertfordshire, in 1592.

In 1607 he was appointed president of Corpus Christi College.

Works
After the death of his friend Richard Hooker he edited the first five books of Hooker's Ecclesiastical Politie (London, 1604). The introduction to that work and A Sermon at Paule's Crosse on Esay V., 2, 3 (London, 1615) are his only published writings. He was also one of the translators of the Authorized Version of the Bible, serving on the New Testament committee.

References

1559 births
1614 deaths
Translators of the King James Version
People educated at Merchant Taylors' School, Northwood
Fellows of Corpus Christi College, Oxford
Presidents of Corpus Christi College, Oxford
16th-century English Anglican priests
17th-century English Anglican priests
17th-century Anglican theologians
16th-century Anglican theologians